Mohammad Aleq (also Romanized as Moḩammad Āleq; also known as Garkaz Maḩalleh) is a village in Gorganbuy Rural District, in the Central District of Aqqala County, Golestan Province, Iran. At the 2006 census, its population was 388, in 74 families.

References 

Populated places in Aqqala County